Suzanne Davies is a British women's footballer who currently plays for Sheffield where she is a striker. She previously played for Nottingham Forest, Doncaster Rovers Belles, and Rotherham United.

Club career
Davies joined Rotherham United Ladies where she was a prolific goalscorer. She scored 50 times as Rotherham won the Midland Combination league in the 2006–2007 season, and scored 25 times the following season as Rotherham survived their first season in the FA Women's Premier League Northern Division.

After leaving Rotherham at the end of the 2007–08 season, after nine years with the club, she joined Doncaster Rovers Belles, upon the third time that Belles manager John Buckley had tried to sign her. However, she struggled to gain a regular place in the Belles starting line-up due to a combination of injury and the prolific goalscoring of Liz Hansen and moved to Nottingham Forest Ladies in August 2009. Davies scored on her debut for new club Forest.

See also
Football in England
List of football clubs in England

References

External links
 Sheffield player profile

Living people
English women's footballers
Doncaster Rovers Belles L.F.C. players
Nottingham Forest Women F.C. players
FA Women's National League players
Sheffield F.C. Ladies players
Women's Championship (England) players
Women's association football forwards
Year of birth missing (living people)